is a Japanese footballer for Albirex Niigata.

Club career
After attending Maebashi Ikuei High School, Taiki Watanabe joined back Albirex Niigata for 2018 season, debuting in a J. League Cup against FC Tokyo.

Club statistics
Updated to 29 August 2018.

References

External links

Profile at J. League
Profile at Albirex Niigata

1999 births
Living people
Association football people from Niigata Prefecture
Japanese footballers
J2 League players
Albirex Niigata players
Association football defenders